The men's 50m freestyle S10 event at the 2012 Summer Paralympics took place at the  London Aquatics Centre on 31 August. There were three heats; the swimmers with the eight fastest times advanced to the final.

Results

Heats
Competed from 10:14.

Heat 1

Heat 2

Heat 3

Final
Competed at 18:06.

 
Q = qualified for final. WR = World Record. PR = Paralympic Record. EU = European Record. AS = Asian Record. AF = African Record. OC = Oceania Record.

Swimming at the 2012 Summer Paralympics